Sayed Houda (19 November 1900 – 8 August 1985) was an Egyptian footballer. He competed at the 1924 Summer Olympics and the 1928 Summer Olympics.

References

External links
 

1900 births
1985 deaths
Egyptian footballers
Egypt international footballers
Olympic footballers of Egypt
Footballers at the 1924 Summer Olympics
Footballers at the 1928 Summer Olympics
Sportspeople from Alexandria
Association football forwards